The 1995 Allan Cup was the Canadian senior ice hockey championship for the 1994–95 senior "AAA" season.  The event was hosted by the Stony Plain Eagles in Stony Plain, Alberta.  The 1995 tournament marked the 87th time that the Allan Cup had been awarded.

The Warroad Lakers won their second consecutive Allan Cup title in 1995, this would mark the sixth time an American club would win the Canadian Senior "AAA" title.

Teams
Powell River Regals (Pacific)
Stony Plain Eagles (Host)
Truro Bearcats (East)
Warroad Lakers (West)

Results
Round Robin
Warroad Lakers 9 - Powell River Regals 1
Truro Bearcats 5 - Stony Plain Eagles 5
Powell River Regals 6 - Truro Bearcats 1
Warroad Lakers 3 - Stony Plain Eagles 2
Truro Bearcats 10 - Warroad Lakers 5
Stony Plain Eagles 5 - Powell River Regals 3
Semi-final
Stony Plain Eagles 5 - Truro Bearcats 3
Final
Warroad Lakers 3 - Stony Plain Eagles 2

External links
Allan Cup archives 
Allan Cup website

Allan Cup
Allan
Allan Cup